This Bed may refer to:

 "This Bed", a song by Alicia Keys from her 2009 album The Element of Freedom
 "This Bed", a song by Kisschasy from their 2005 album United Paper People